Theli is the fifth album released by the symphonic metal band Therion. While Theli stays true to the band's roots in that it has a very dark sound, it is a major turning point in their history. Set, Egyptian god, is shown on the front cover. This was the last album on which Christofer Johnsson sang until 2004's "Lemuria".  A music video was filmed for the song "To Mega Therion". The song To Mega Therion appears in the shockumentary film Traces of Death IV.

Track listing

The title of "To Mega Therion" is a Greek reference to The Beast in the Christian Book of Revelation.

Credits

Therion line-up
Christofer Johnsson – guitar, vocals, keyboards
Piotr Wawrzeniuk – drums, vocals
Lars Rosenberg – bass guitar
Jonas Mellberg – guitar, acoustic guitar, keyboards

Guest musicians
Dan Swanö – vocals
Jan Peter Genkel – grand piano, keyboards, programming
Gottfried Koch – keyboards, programming

North German Radio Choir
Raphaela Mayhaus – soprano
Bettina Stumm – soprano
Ursula Ritters – alto
Ergin Onat – tenor
Joachim Gebhardt – bass
Klaus Bulow – bass

Siren Choir
Anja Krenz – solo soprano
Constanze Arens – soprano
Riekje Weber – alto
Stephan Gade – tenor
Axel Patz – solo bass-baritone

Single
"The Siren of the Woods"

Cover design
Cover was made by Peter Grøn.

References

External links
 
  (Japanese edition)
 
 Information about album at the official website

1996 albums
Therion (band) albums
Nuclear Blast albums